Margareta Eriksdotter may refer to:

 Margaret of Sweden, Queen of Norway (c. 1155–1209)
 Margaret Leijonhufvud (1516–1551)